William Lind (born 12 February 1985) is a Swedish orienteering competitor. At the 2016 World Orienteering Championships in Strömstad he won a bronze medal in relay with the Swedish team, along with Gustav Bergman and Fredrik Bakkman. He won his first individual medal in the 2017 long championships in Estonia, receiving a bronze medal behind Norwegian Olav Lundanes and Russian runner Leonid Novikov.

References

External links

1985 births
Living people
Swedish orienteers
Male orienteers
Foot orienteers
World Orienteering Championships medalists